Ulysse Jean-Baptiste Gémignani (1906 in Paris – 1973) was a French sculptor. He was the husband of the French composer Yvonne Desportes whom he met when they were both prize-winners of the Prix de Rome staying at the Villa Médicis in 1934.

References

1906 births
1973 deaths
20th-century French sculptors
French male sculptors
Prix de Rome for sculpture